Zac Stuart-Pontier is an American film editor, host and producer. He is known for his work on the HBO documentary The Jinx, Catfish and Martha Marcy May Marlene.

Life and career

Zac was born in Honesdale, Pennsylvania. He graduated from NYU's Tisch School of the Arts. In 2010, he edited and co-produced the film, Catfish, premiered at the 2010 Sundance Film Festival.

Zac is the co-host and co-creator of the true crime podcasts Crimetown  with Marc Smerling, which debuted in 2016 and quickly became the most popular U.S. podcast on iTunes. They also co-created The RFK Tapes a Crimetown Presents podcast about the Assassination of Robert F. Kennedy.

Filmography

Awards and nominations

References

External links 

1983 births
Living people
American film editors
American Cinema Editors
American film producers
People associated with true crime
Primetime Emmy Award winners